Omair Khan (born 27 January 1970) is an Indian politician from eastern Indian State, Bihar. Omair, a leader of the Indian National Congress, previously he also served in Jan Adhikar Party as Bihar state Working president and spokesperson of the Jan Adhikar Party. Khan has been leading protests against CAA-NRC at Shantibagh, Gaya under the 'Samvidhan Bachao Morcha' banner.

Education 
In 1985, Khan completed his 10th standard from Gaya High school, in Gaya. In 1987, he completed the 12th standard from Aligarh Muslim University (AMU). He graduated with a BA(Hons) in History from AMU.

In 1990 Khan received a gold medal during his graduation. In 1992, he completed his post-graduate work and earned an MA in History from AMU. He also has a diploma in marketing management from the National Institute of Sales in New Delhi.

References

External links 
 
 

1970 births
Living people
Politicians from Patna
Gaya, India
Indian National Congress politicians from Bihar